"B Boy Baby" is a song written by British recording artist Mutya Buena with prominent background vocals by singer Amy Winehouse. The song heavily samples "Be My Baby" by The Ronettes, written by Phil Spector, Ellie Greenwich, Jeff Barry, with new lyrics by Angela Hunte, It was produced by Salaam Remi for Buena's debut album, Real Girl (2007) and released as the fourth and final single from the album in December 2007.

Background
Buena left the girl group Sugababes in December 2005, shortly after the birth of her daughter. She began working on her debut solo album after signing with Island Records. "B Boy Baby" resulted from sessions with British producer Salaam Remi, famous for his work with Amy Winehouse, Nas, and Fugees. It borrows lyrical and melodic passages from "Be My Baby" by The Ronettes, with the sampled chorus sung by Winehouse.

Reception
Sharon Mawer of Allmusic wrote, "Buena raps the verses on "B Boy Baby" before launching into a chorus consisting of a slowed down version of the Ronettes/Phil Spector '60s masterpiece which even Amy Winehouse couldn't save from dreary boredom." Popjustice's Peter Robinson hoped that Winehouse's appearance on the "almost universally disapproved-of" song could help Buena's fledgling solo career "turn around." The single was ultimately a commercial failure, charting at number 73 on the UK Singles Chart. However, promotion for the single did see Real Girl return to the UK Albums Chart, re-entering the lower end of the charts at number 88 and rising to number 83. "B Boy Baby" has since been used in various adverts on UK television.

Music video
The video premiered on 4Music on 4 December 2007. It was filmed in Millennium Square, Bristol, and features "The Physical Jerks" – a group of break dancers. Amy Winehouse was supposed to appear in the video, however, she was ultimately unable to.

Track listing
 CD single
 "B Boy Baby" (Radio Edit) – 3:02
 "Fast Car" (BBC Radio 1 Live Lounge Session) – 3:12
 "B Boy Baby" (Video) – 3:05

 Digital download EP
 "B Boy Baby" (Radio Edit) – 3:02
 "B Boy Baby" (Soul Seekerz Remix) – 5:36
 "B Boy Baby" (Music Kidz Remix) – 6:37

Charts

Weekly charts

Year-end charts

References

2007 singles
Songs written by Ellie Greenwich
Songs written by Jeff Barry
Songs written by Phil Spector
Amy Winehouse songs
Mutya Buena songs
Year of song missing
4th & B'way Records singles
Songs written by Angela Hunte